Barry Bishop may refer to:
Barry Bishop (mountaineer) (1932–1994), American mountaineer
Barry Bishop (politician) (born 1938), Australian politician

See also